The Physician Executive Journal is a journal published for more than 20 years by the American College of Physician Executives. The journal is published bimonthly and contains peer-reviewed articles on a wide variety of medical management subjects to help physician executives get connected to leaders and experts working in the field. It is the winner of several Gold Awards from the American Society of Healthcare Publication.

External links
The Physician Executive Journal

Business and management journals